Barry Stephen Odom (born November 26, 1976) is an American football coach and currently the head coach at the University of Nevada, Las Vegas. Odom previously spent 15 years with the University of Missouri football program as a player, recruiter, assistant coach, and head coach.

High school playing career
Odom played high school football as a linebacker and running back at Maysville Junior-Senior High School in Maysville, Oklahoma, before transferring to Ada High School in Ada, Oklahoma for his senior season. Intent on playing major college football at Maysville, Odom spent his senior year in Ada, where Odom helped the team to a second straight state title. Odom's first game for Ada High School came in 1994 against their rival, Ardmore. Odom guided the team to a 39–13 victory that night. Odom finished his senior season with 39 touchdowns.

After Odom ran the 100-meter dash in 10.6 seconds, in the spring of his senior year, Larry Smith offered him a scholarship at the University of Missouri.

College career
Odom played college football at the University of Missouri as a linebacker from 1996 to 1999. He recorded 72 tackles as a freshman. In the spring of 1997, he tore his ACL but recovered in time to start all 12 games of his sophomore season. Odom was chosen as a team captain as a senior in 1999 and would go on to finish with 362 tackles — the seventh-most in school history. Odom was a key figure on the Missouri teams which reached bowl games in 1997 and 1998.

Odom earned his bachelor's degree from MU in 1999, and a master's degree in education from MU in 2004.

Odom wore No. 39 to honor the year the university started, 1839.

Coaching career

Early career
After earning his undergraduate degree in December 1999, he served as an intern with Mizzou's Tiger Scholarship Fund while he worked on his Master's in Education from the University of Missouri (which he would earn in May 2004). He returned to his home state of Oklahoma in July of that year to serve as an assistant football coach for his alma mater Ada High School, which finished that season as runners-up for a state title.

Odom returned to his adopted hometown of Columbia, Mo., taking over as head coach at Rock Bridge High School. Odom helped the program turn around, which hadn't had a winning season since 1997. The Bruins went 6–4 in 2001, a two-win improvement from the previous season. The next year, Odom guided Rock Bridge to an 8-4 campaign and an appearance in the Class 6 semifinals. Six weeks after the season ended, Gary Pinkel hired Odom as a graduate assistant at Missouri, and Odom began a nine-year period of serving in various roles on Gary Pinkel's staff.

Missouri
In 2003, Odom returned to Missouri as an administrative graduate assistant. He stayed at Missouri until 2012, serving in numerous different coaching and administrative positions.

2003–2008

Wanting to run a college program, Odom joined the Mizzou staff, first as an administrative graduate assistant for Gary Pinkel in 2003. He spent the 2004 and 2005 seasons as Pinkel's director of recruiting as the staff assembled a core group which would help lead Mizzou to consecutive Big 12 Conference North Division titles in 2007 and 2008 which consisted of 12-win and 10-win seasons, respectively.

From 2006 to 2008, Odom helped run Pinkel's program administratively as his director of operations. In that role, Odom oversaw coordination of the team's budget, travel plans (including bowl trips to the Sun, Cotton and Alamo bowls during that stretch), compliance issues, facilities operations and scheduling, as well as assisting with recruiting operations and managing the day-to-day overall operations of the program.

As director of football operations, he coordinated all public relations activities and community service events that required the presence of Mizzou's football student-athletes, and also played a role as part of the design and planning team that oversaw the expansion and renovation of the Mizzou Athletics Training Complex, which opened in February 2008.

2009–2011

In 2009, Odom took over as safeties coach under Pinkel.

He helped the Tigers climb from 104th in the nation in pass yards allowed/game in 2009, to 37th in the nation in 2010.  During his three seasons as safeties coach, the Missouri Tigers went 26–13, including a 2010 Big 12 North division title.  The 2010 team defense finished 11th in the nation in defensive pass rating, 19th nationally with 18 interceptions, 12th nationally in touchdowns allowed, 10th nationally in yards/attempt.

Defensive coordinator

Memphis (2012–2014)
In 2012, Odom left Missouri to become defensive coordinator of the Memphis Tigers under head coach Justin Fuente. In 2015, Odom again returned to Missouri, this time to serve as defensive coordinator.

Memphis ranked 117th nationally in total defense in 2011, the season before Odom joined staff. Three years later, Memphis ranked 28th.

Odom became well known due to his performance during three years directing Memphis’ defense from 2012 to 2014. His 2014 defense was a key component of Memphis’ 10–3 season, as his unit finished the regular season ranked fifth nationally in scoring defense (17.1 avg.) and 22nd in total defense (343.3 avg.). In his first season at Memphis, the defense improved to 50th nationally (383.6 avg.), followed by a jump to 39th in 2013 (370.7 avg.). Memphis earned a share of the 2014 American Athletic Conference title, giving them a conference championship for the first time since 1971.

Missouri (2015)
After the 2014 season, Missouri needed a new defensive coordinator after Dave Steckel left to become the head coach at Missouri State. Pinkel tabbed Odom as Steckel's replacement.

Odom's Tigers ranked ninth in the nation in total defense, allowing just 302.0 yards per game. Since the NCAA began tracking defensive statistics in 1978, this marks the first time in MU history that Mizzou has had a top-10 defense. Odom's defense was also ranked seventh nationally in scoring defense (16.2 avg.), seventh in pass defense (169.2 avg.) and second in tackles for loss (8.8 avg.).

Promotion to Missouri HC

Odom was named the head coach of the Missouri Tigers football team on December 3, 2015, after former head coach Gary Pinkel retired after 15 seasons due to health-related issues. At 38, Coach Odom was the second youngest head coach for the Missouri Tigers. As of 2019, Odom is paid $3.05 million a year which ranks 11th among 14 head coaches in the SEC Conference. Prior to Odom's contract extension in December 2018, he was the lowest-paid coach in the conference.

2016
Odom worked through a rebuilding year in 2016 that saw Mizzou win four games. The Tigers closed the season out with wins in two of their final three games – with both coming against bowl teams in Arkansas and Vanderbilt.

2017
In 2017, Odom helped the Tigers achieve a seven-win season, earning the program its first bowl game since 2014.  Mizzou closed the regular season with a six-game win streak that culminated in a road win at Arkansas.  The win moved Mizzou to 7-5 marking an in-season turnaround that saw MU rebound from a 1–5 start on the year.

Odom's team earned an invitation to the 2017 Academy Sports + Outdoor Texas Bowl for its effort; however, the result of the bowl game didn't go Mizzou's way.  Coming off a 4–8 season in 2016, Mizzou was picked to finish last in the seven-team Southeastern Conference Eastern Division by pre-season experts, but the Tigers proved the prediction wrong, as they ended tied for third at 4–4 in league play – becoming the first SEC team to start 0–4 in conference play and finish 4–4.

Odom became the first Mizzou coach to make a bowl game in his second year at MU since Warren Powers did so in each of his first two seasons in 1978 and 1979.

2018
In 2018, Odom's Tigers finished a regular-season ranked No. 23 in the College Football Playoff poll (No. 24 in the Associated Press poll) with eight wins, reached a second-straight bowl game, and achieved another road win.  His 8–4 record during the 2018 season, marked just the 17th time in Mizzou's 128-year history that the Tigers have recorded an eight-win regular season.

Heading into 2019, several national outlets have the Tigers ranked in their pre-season top-25 polls – with one slotting MU as high as number 13.

Odom and his staff worked to assemble a 2019 signing class that ranked 31st (Rivals.com), a standing that's among the highest-ranked classes ever assembled at Mizzou.  Odom also convinced transfer quarterback Kelly Bryant to become a Tiger.  The former Clemson starter, who led them to the College Football Playoff in 2017 and had a starting record of 16–2, will be in the program for 2019.

On the field, Odom guided his troops to an 8–5 record in 2018 and to the school's third all-time appearance in the AutoZone Liberty Bowl.  After increasing his win total each year since taking over in 2016, Odom's three-year career stands at 19–19.  He is only the fourth coach in Mizzou history to reach bowl games in two of his first three seasons at MU, joining College Football Hall of Fame Coach Dan Devine in that category, as well as former coaches Al Onofrio and Powers.

In the classroom, Odom's program achieved at a record level in 2018.  The team turned in a grade point average of 2.90 this past fall, which exceeded the previous program record of 2.69 set in the fall of 2015.  Additionally, 58 team members – more than half of the 115-man roster – earned a fall GPA of at least 3.0, which is almost double the total of 30 Tigers from fall 2017 who recorded a 3.0 or better.

For the second-straight season, Odom's team finished the regular season in a 4–0 win streak in the month of November, including a 38–17 win at No. 11 Florida on Nov. 3 that marked Mizzou's largest road win over a ranked opponent since 2008.  Odom's teams have now won nine-straight games in the month of November, and are 10–2 overall.  His 19 wins are the most through three seasons by a Tiger coach since Powers won 23 from 1978 to 1980.

2019
After starting 2019 with an unexpected loss to Wyoming, Missouri won their next five games.  They then lost their next five, including losses to Kentucky, Tennessee, and Vanderbilt.  Odom's team won the final 2019 regular season game against 2–9 Arkansas.

Odom was fired the next morning.

Arkansas
On December 16, 2019, Odom was hired by new Arkansas Razorbacks head coach Sam Pittman as defensive coordinator.

UNLV
On December 6, 2022 the Las Vegas Review-Journal reported Odom would be named head coach at UNLV.

Personal life
Born in Lawton, Oklahoma, Odom and his wife Tia were married in July 2000. Tia is a native of Kahoka, Missouri, and is a graduate of the University of Missouri's College of Human Environmental Sciences. The couple have three children.

Head coaching record

College

References

External links
 UNLV profile
 Arkansas profile

1976 births
Living people
American football linebackers
Memphis Tigers football coaches
Missouri Tigers football coaches
Arkansas Razorbacks football coaches
Missouri Tigers football players
High school football coaches in Missouri
High school football coaches in Oklahoma
Sportspeople from Ada, Oklahoma
Sportspeople from Lawton, Oklahoma
People from Maysville, Oklahoma
Coaches of American football from Oklahoma
Players of American football from Oklahoma